Gutach may refer to:

towns in Baden-Württemberg, Germany:
Gutach im Breisgau, in the district of Emmendingen
Gutach (Schwarzwaldbahn), in the Ortenau district
rivers in southern Black Forest, Germany:
Gutach (Kinzig), in the Ortenau district, running through Gutach (Schwarzwaldbahn)
Gutach (Elz) or Wilde Gutach, running into the Elz (Rhine) at Gutach im Breisgau
 Gutach, one of the rivers whose confluence forms the Wutach